Local elections were held in Marinduque on May 9, 2022, as part of the 2022 Philippine general election. Voters selected candidates for all local positions: a town mayor, vice mayor and town councilors, as well as members of the Sangguniang Panlalawigan, a vice-governor, a governor and a representative for the province's at-large congressional district in the House of Representatives.

The local office of the Commission on Elections (COMELEC) in the province confirmed that as of September 29, 2021, some 159,000 eligible voters throughout Marinduque were registered to vote for this election. While this number is lower than in previous provincial elections, the COMELEC expected the number of registered voters to increase with the extension of voter registration brought about by the impact of the COVID-19 pandemic in the Philippines.

Provincial elections
On October 9, 2021, the COMELEC released its final list of candidates running for provincial office, with 29 candidates vying for 11 posts.

Governor
Incumbent governor Presbitero Velasco Jr. was eligible to run for a second term in office, and ran for re-election. His vice governor, Romulo Bacorro, joined Aksyon Demokratiko on September 23, 2021, in the process leaving PDP–Laban, and sought the governorship against Velasco.

On October 3, 2021, James Marty Lim, barangay captain of Barangay Dos in Gasan and national chairman emeritus of the League of Barangays in the Philippines, announced on Facebook that he would run for governor. Lim last sought a province-wide post in 2007, when he ran for congressman against Carmencita Reyes, while his mother, Gasan mayor Victoria L. Lim, also unsuccessfully sought the governorship against Reyes in the 2016 election. Lim filed his certificate of candidacy on October 5, 2021, and ran under his Alliance for Barangay Concerns party list.

Per Municipality

Vice Governor
Romulo Bacorro, the incumbent vice governor, was eligible to run for another term but instead sought the governorship. His running mate was John R. Pelaez, a member of the Marinduque Provincial Board who, along with Bacorro and fellow Provincial Board member Gilbert Daquioag, joined Aksyon on September 23, 2021.

On October 1, 2021, Teodolfo "Tito" Rejano, brother of former Vice Governor Teodoro "Teody" Rejano, filed his certificate of candidacy for the vice governorship as an independent, becoming the first candidate in Marinduque to formally file their candidacy with the COMELEC. Five days later on October 6, former Provincial Board member Reynaldo Salvacion, who ran for governor in the 2019 election, filed his certificate of candidacy for the post, running in the election as the running mate of James Marty Lim. Meanwhile, in the final list of candidates running for provincial-level positions released by the COMELEC, Provincial Board member Adeline Angeles was announced as the running mate of Presbitero Velasco Jr.

Per Municipality

Provincial Board

In the final list of candidates running for provincial-level positions released by the COMELEC, 20 candidates were announced as running for eight seats in the Provincial Board, with eleven candidates running in the first district and nine in the second district.

1st District
Municipality: Boac, Mogpog, Gasan

|colspan=5 bgcolor=black|

2nd District
Municipality: Santa Cruz, Torrijos, Buenavista

|colspan=5 bgcolor=black|

Congressional election 
Lord Allan Velasco, Speaker of the House of Representatives and son of governor Presbitero Velasco Jr., was the incumbent and was eligible to run for another term. He initially announced his candidacy for re-election on July 26, 2021, and confirmed this with local media outlet Marinduque News on October 3, 2021.

Velasco's opponent in the election was supposed to be former Provincial Board member Jojo Alvarez of Boac, running under Aksyon. However, Alvarez's certificate of candidacy was canceled by the COMELEC on December 14, 2021, and took effect on January 5, 2022.

Municipal elections
Parties are as stated in their certificates of candidacy.

Boac
In Boac, the provincial capital, the municipal election was contested primarily between candidates from PDP–Laban and the Partido Federal ng Pilipinas (PFP).

Mayor
Incumbent Armi Carrion, the widow of former governor Jose Antonio Carrion, ran for re-election.

Vice Mayor
Incumbent Sonny Paglinawan ran for re-election. Unlike in the 2019 election, where he ran under PDP–Laban, he ran as a candidate of the PFP. PDP–Laban's candidate for the vice mayoral election was former Provincial Board member Mark Anthony Seño.

Mogpog
In Mogpog, the municipal election was contested primarily between candidates from PDP–Laban and several independent candidates, with Aksyon fielding one candidate for councilor.

Mayor
Incumbent Augusto Leo Livelo ran for re-election.

Vice Mayor
Incumbent Jonathan Garcia ran unopposed.

Gasan
In Gasan, the municipal election was contested primarily between candidates from the Alliance for Barangay Concerns, which last fielded candidates in the 2010 election, PDP–Laban and several independent candidates.

Mayor
Incumbent Victoria L. Lim, the mother of James Marty Lim, ran for re-election. Unlike in the 2019 election, where she ran under PDP–Laban, she ran as a candidate of the ABC. Her opponents in the election were former mayor Rolando Tolentino, who was PDP–Laban's candidate for this position, and the incumbent vice mayor, Yudel Sosa.

Vice Mayor
Incumbent Yudel Sosa was term limited and ran for mayor.

Santa Cruz
In Santa Cruz, the municipal election was contested primarily between candidates from Lakas–CMD, the Nationalist People's Coalition and the People's Reform Party.

Mayor
Incumbent Antonio Uy Jr. ran for re-election. Unlike in the 2019 election, where he ran under the United Nationalist Alliance, he ran as a candidate of the PRP. His opponents in the election were former mayor Marisa Red, and the incumbent vice mayor, Geraldine Morales.

Vice Mayor
Incumbent Geraldine Morales ran for mayor.

Torrijos
In Torrijos, the municipal election was contested primarily between candidates from PDP–Laban and Aksyon.

Mayor
Incumbent Lorna Velasco, the wife of Presbitero Velasco Jr., ran for re-election.

Vice Mayor
Incumbent Ricardo de Galicia ran for re-election.

Buenavista
In Buenavista, the municipal election was contested primarily between candidates from PDP–Laban and Aksyon.

Mayor
Incumbent Nancy Madrigal ran for re-election.

Vice Mayor
David Vitto assumed office after the death of Vice Mayor Hannilee Siena and ran for his first full term.

References

2022 Philippine local elections
Elections in Marinduque
May 2022 events in the Philippines